Requiem for What's His Name is the second album by Marc Ribot & The Rootless Cosmopolitans which was released by the Belgian label Les Disques du Crepuscule in 1992.

Recording
The album was recorded in New York City at Sound on Sound Recording except "Commit a Crime" which was recorded live at Desi Stadtteilzentrum in Nuremberg, Germany. Ribot stated "On the next record, Requiem for What’s His Name, the focus moved towards composition. It’s almost impossible to get hold of it. I was interested in Balkan music at the time, certain ritual music ... in finding stuff I could do without ironic distance. For example, on Requiem for What’s His Name, I covered “Sometimes I Feel like a Motherless Child,” one of the sadder songs in the world. I couldn’t do it without distance, but I wanted to make that distance painful, bring it to some kind of breaking point".

Reception
The Allmusic review by Brian Beatty awarded the album 4 stars, stating, "On his second release as a bandleader, guitarist Marc Ribot is joined by players familiar from his gigs as a hired sideman, including saxophonist Roy Nathanson of the Lounge Lizards and the Jazz Passengers and multi-reed player Ralph Carney from Tom Waits' touring band. Though less swinging and fresh than 1990's Rootless Cosmopolitans, this album's original compositions and renditions of Duke Ellington and Howlin' Wolf tunes still leave plenty of room for Ribot's discordant guitar stylings".

Track listing
All compositions are by Marc Ribot, except where indicated otherwise.
 "Requiem for What's His Name" – 4:29
 "Disposable Head" – 2:50
 "Clever White Youths" – 4:30
 "First Time Every Time" – 2:01
 "Motherless Child" (Anonymous) – 1:06
 "New" – 4:18
 "Reveille" – 1:08
 "Lamonte's Nightmare" (Anthony Coleman) – 5:56
 "March" – 2:00
 "Pony" (Ribot, Coleman) – 2:14
 "Yo, I Killed Your God" – 2:39
 "Commit A Crime" (Chester Burnett) – 3:19
 "Caravan" (Juan Tizol, Duke Ellington, Irving Mills) – 3:48
 "Blues" – 3:11
 "1 Adolph 12" (Ribot, Jones) – 6:57

Personnel
Marc Ribot – guitars, vocals, E-flat horn, piano, drum sequencing
Wilbo Wright (1, 2, 7–8, 11, 13) – detuned guitar (on (1)), bass
Roy Nathanson (1, 2, 4, 6, 9, 13, 15) – soprano, chermia, alto, tenor
Ralph Carney (1–4, 6–9, 11–12, 14) – alto, sona, tenor, clarinet, assorted duck calls
Anthony Coleman (1–3, 6–8, 10–14) – pump organ, sampler, piano, organ
Simeon Cain (1–4, 6–9, 11, 13, 15) – drums, percussion, drum overdubs
Syd Straw (3, 10) – background vocals, vocals
Zeena Parkins (6) – electric harp
Brad Jones (6, 15) – bass
Greg Jones (12, 14) – bass
Rock Savage (12, 14) – drums
J.D. Parran (15) – clarinet

References 

1992 albums
Marc Ribot albums